Agios Theodoros is a village in the Limassol District of Cyprus, near the town of Palaichori Morphou.

References

Communities in Limassol District